Dyspessa ruekbeili is a moth in the family Cossidae. It was described by Yakovlev in 2007. It is found in Central Asia.

The length of the forewings is about 9.5 mm. The forewings are brown with a dark brown border. The hindwings are brown.

References

Natural History Museum Lepidoptera generic names catalog

Moths described in 2007
Dyspessa
Moths of Asia